The Summit League Men's Basketball Player of the Year is an annual college basketball award given to the most outstanding men's basketball player in the Summit League (which had been known as the Mid-Continent Conference up until June 1, 2007). The award was first given following the 1982–83 season. Two players—Caleb Green of Oral Roberts and Mike Daum of South Dakota State—have won the award three times. Five other players have won the award twice: Jon Collins of Eastern Illinois, Tony Bennett of Wisconsin–Green Bay, Bryce Drew of Valparaiso, Keith Benson of Oakland and Max Abmas of Oral Roberts.

Oral Roberts has the most winners with seven. Current member South Dakota State has had six. Oakland has had three winners, but left after the 2012–13 season to join the Horizon League. Of current conference members, North Dakota, Omaha, St. Thomas, and South Dakota have had no winners. However, all are among the conference's newer members, with South Dakota having joined in 2011, Omaha in 2012, North Dakota in 2018, and St. Thomas in 2021.

Key

Winners

Winners by school
In this table, the "year joined" refers to the calendar year in which each school joined the conference. The "Years" column reflects the calendar years in which each award was presented.

Footnotes

References

NCAA Division I men's basketball conference players of the year
Player of the Year
Awards established in 1983